The Ulster Unionist Party (UUP) is a unionist political party in Northern Ireland. The party was founded in 1905, emerging from the Irish Unionist Alliance in Ulster. Under Edward Carson, it led unionist opposition to the Irish Home Rule movement. Following the partition of Ireland, it was the governing party of Northern Ireland between 1921 and 1972. It was supported by most unionist voters throughout the conflict known as the Troubles, during which time it was often referred to as the Official Unionist Party (OUP).

Under David Trimble, the party helped negotiate the Good Friday Agreement of 1998, which ended the conflict. Trimble served as the first First Minister of Northern Ireland from 1998 to 2002. However, it was overtaken as the largest unionist party in 2003 by the Democratic Unionist Party (DUP). As of 2022 it is the fourth-largest party in the Northern Ireland Assembly, after the DUP, Sinn Féin, and the Alliance Party. The party has been unrepresented in Westminster since losing its two seats in 2017. Since 2021 the party has been led by Doug Beattie.

Between 1905 and 1972, its peers and MPs took the Conservative Party whip at Westminster, in effect functioning as the Northern Irish branch of the party. This arrangement came to an end in 1972 over disagreements over the Sunningdale Agreement. The two parties have remained institutionally separate ever since, with the exception of the 2009–2012 Ulster Conservatives and Unionists electoral alliance.

History 
The Ulster Unionist Party traces its formal existence back to the foundation of the Ulster Unionist Council in 1905.

Background: 1886 to 1905
 
Modern organised unionism emerged after William Ewart Gladstone's introduction in 1886 of the first of three Home Rule Bills in response to demands by the Irish Parliamentary Party. In 1891, the Irish Conservative Party came to an end, merged into a new Irish Unionist Alliance (IUA) which also included the Irish Liberal Unionists, the latter having split from the Liberal Party over the issue of home rule. While usually dominated by unionists from Ulster, the IUA was often led by southern unionists. There were also some eighty members of the House of Lords who affiliated themselves with the IUA.

The Ulster Defence Union was also formed on 17 March 1893 to oppose the Liberal government’s plans for the Government of Ireland Bill 1893. 

Although most unionist support was based in Ulster, especially within areas that later became Northern Ireland, in the late 19th and early 20th century there were unionist enclaves throughout all of Ireland. Unionists in Dublin and County Wicklow and in parts of County Cork were particularly influential.

1905 to 1921 
In September 1904, the Conservative government of Arthur Balfour published proposals for limited devolution to Ireland which would not amount to home rule. Coming from Conservatives, these led to great alarm among Irish unionists, and in March 1905 the Ulster Unionist Council, which later became the Ulster Unionist Party, was formed as a co-ordinating organization for a new form of local political activity. It largely subsumed the Ulster Defence Union.

From the beginning, the new organization had a strong association with the Orange Order, a Protestant fraternal organisation. The original composition of the Ulster Unionist Council was 25% Orange delegates; however, this proportion was reduced through the years. The initial leadership of the Ulster unionists all came from outside what would later become Northern Ireland. In particular, from 1905 Colonel Saunderson was simultaneously leader of the Irish Unionist Alliance MPs and leader of the Ulster Unionist Council in Belfast. In 1906 he was succeeded in both roles by Walter Hume Long, a Dublin MP. Another Dubliner, Sir Edward Carson, one of the two Irish Unionist Alliance MPs for the Dublin University constituency, and Lord Midleton were also southern unionists active in both. Carson went on to become the first leader of the Ulster Unionist Party, from 1910. Throughout his years of leadership, he fought a sustained campaign against Irish Home Rule, including taking the lead in the formation of the Ulster Volunteers at the onset of the Home Rule Crisis in 1912. 

In 1912, at Westminster the Home Rule Crisis led to the Liberal Unionist Party merging with the Conservatives, thus giving rise to the current name of the Conservative and Unionist Party, to which the Ulster Unionist Party was formally linked, to varying degrees, until 1985.

At the 1918 general election, Carson switched constituencies from Dublin University to Belfast Duncairn.

After the Irish Convention of 1917–1918 failed to reach an understanding on home rule, and even more after the Partition of Ireland under the Government of Ireland Act 1920, Irish unionism in effect split. Many southern unionist politicians quickly became reconciled with the new Irish Free State, sitting in its Senate or joining its political parties, while in Northern Ireland  the existence of a separate Ulster Unionist Party became entrenched as it took control of the new Government of Northern Ireland, established in 1921.

Carson strongly opposed the partition of Ireland and the end of unionism as an all-Ireland political force, so he refused the opportunity to be Prime Minister of Northern Ireland or even to sit in the Northern Ireland House of Commons, citing a lack of connection with the new province. The leadership of the UUP and, subsequently, Northern Ireland, was taken by Sir James Craig.

The Stormont era: Part of the Conservative Party

1920–1963 
Until almost the very end of its period of power in Northern Ireland, the UUP was led by a combination of landed gentry (The 1st Viscount Brookeborough, Hugh MacDowell Pollock and James Chichester-Clark), aristocracy (Terence O'Neill) and gentrified industrial magnates (The 1st Viscount Craigavon and J. M. Andrews – nephew of The 1st Viscount Pirrie). Only its last Prime Minister, Brian Faulkner, was from a middle-class background. During this era, all but 11 of the 149 UUP Stormont MPs were members of the Orange Order, as were all Prime Ministers.

Sir James Craig, who in 1927 was created Viscount Craigavon, led the government of Northern Ireland from its inception until his death in November 1940 and is buried with his wife by the east wing of Parliament Buildings at Stormont. His successor, J. M. Andrews, was heavily criticised for appointing octogenarian veterans of Lord Craigavon's administration to his cabinet. His government was also believed to be more interested in protecting the statue of Carson at the Stormont Estate than the citizens of Belfast during the Belfast blitz. A backbench revolt in 1943 resulted in his resignation and replacement by Sir Basil Brooke (later Viscount Brookeborough), although Andrews was recognised as leader of the party until 1946.

Lord Brookeborough, despite having felt that Craigavon had held on to power for too long, was Prime Minister for one year longer. During this time he was on more than one occasion called to meetings of the Grand Orange Lodge of Ireland to explain his actions, most notably following the 1947 Education Act which made the government responsible for the payment of National Insurance contributions of teachers in Catholic Church-controlled schools. Ian Paisley called for Brookeborough's resignation in 1953 when he refused to sack Brian Maginess and Clarence Graham, who had given speeches supporting re-admitting Catholics to the UUP. He retired in 1963 and was replaced by Terence O'Neill, who emerged ahead of other candidates, Jack Andrews and Faulkner.

1963–1972 
In the 1960s, identifying with the civil rights movement of Martin Luther King Jr. and encouraged by attempts at reform under O'Neill, various organisations campaigned for civil rights, calling for changes to the system for allocating public housing and the voting system for the local government franchise, which was restricted to (disproportionately Protestant) rate payers. O'Neill had pushed through some reforms but in the process the Ulster Unionists became strongly divided. At the 1969 Stormont general election UUP candidates stood on both pro- and anti-O'Neill platforms. Several independent pro-O'Neill unionists challenging his critics, while the Protestant Unionist Party of Ian Paisley mounted a hard-line challenge. The result proved inconclusive for O'Neill, who resigned a short time later. His resignation was probably caused by a speech of James Chichester-Clark who stated that he disagreed with the timing, but not the principle, of universal suffrage at local elections.

Chichester-Clark won the leadership election to replace O'Neill and swiftly moved to implement many of O'Neill's reforms. Civil disorder continued to mount, culminating in August 1969 when Catholic Bogside residents clashed with the Royal Ulster Constabulary in Derry because of an Apprentice Boys of Derry march, sparking days of riots. Early in 1971, Chichester-Clark flew to London to request further military aid following the 1971 Scottish soldiers' killings. When this was all but refused, he resigned to be replaced by Brian Faulkner.

Faulkner's government struggled though 1971 and into 1972. After Bloody Sunday, the British Government threatened to remove control of the security forces from the devolved government. Faulkner reacted by resigning with his entire cabinet, and the British Government suspended, and eventually abolished, the Northern Ireland Parliament, replacing it with Direct Rule.

The liberal unionist group, the New Ulster Movement, which had advocated the policies of Terence O'Neill, left and formed the Alliance Party of Northern Ireland in April 1970, while the emergence of Ian Paisley's Protestant Unionist Party continued to draw off some working-class and more Ulster loyalist support.

1972–1995 

In June 1973 the UUP won a majority of seats in the new Northern Ireland Assembly, but the party was divided on policy. The Sunningdale Agreement, which led to the formation of a power-sharing Executive under Ulster Unionist leader Brian Faulkner, ruptured the party. In the 1973 elections to the Executive the party found itself divided, a division that did not formally end until January 1974 with the triumph of the anti-Sunningdale faction. Faulkner was then overthrown, and he set up the Unionist Party of Northern Ireland (UPNI). The Ulster Unionists were then led by Harry West from 1974 until 1979. In the February 1974 general election, the party participated in the United Ulster Unionist Coalition (UUUC) with Vanguard and the Democratic Unionist Party, successor to the Protestant Unionist Party. The result was that the UUUC won 11 out of 12 parliamentary seats in Northern Ireland on a fiercely anti-Sunningdale platform, although they barely won 50% of the overall popular vote. This result was a fatal blow for the Executive, which soon collapsed.

Up until 1972 the UUP sat with the Conservative Party at Westminster, traditionally taking the Conservative parliamentary whip. To all intents and purposes the party functioned as the Northern Ireland branch of the Conservative Party. In 1972, in protest over the prorogation of the Parliament of Northern Ireland, the Westminster Ulster Unionist MPs withdrew from the alliance. The party remained affiliated to the National Union of Conservative and Unionist Associations, but in 1985, withdrew from it as well, in protest over the Anglo-Irish Agreement. Subsequently, the Conservative Party has organised separately in Northern Ireland, with little electoral success.

Under West's leadership, the party recruited Enoch Powell, who became Ulster Unionist MP for South Down in October 1974 after defecting from the Conservatives. Powell advocated a policy of 'integration', whereby Northern Ireland would be administered as an integral part of the United Kingdom. This policy divided both the Ulster Unionists and the wider unionist movement, as Powell's ideas conflicted with those supporting a restoration of devolved government to Northern Ireland. The party also made gains upon the break-up of the Vanguard Party and its merger back into the Ulster Unionists. The separate United Ulster Unionist Party (UUUP) emerged from the remains of Vanguard but folded in the early 1980s, as did the UPNI. In both cases the main beneficiaries of this were the Ulster Unionists, now under the leadership of James Molyneaux (1979–95).

Trimble leadership 
David Trimble led the party between 1995 and 2005. His support for the Belfast Agreement caused a rupture within the party into pro-agreement and anti-agreement factions. Trimble served as First Minister of Northern Ireland in the power-sharing administration created under the Belfast Agreement.

Unusually for a unionist party, the UUP had a Catholic MLA in the Northern Ireland Assembly, Sir John Gorman until the 2003 election. In March 2005, the Orange Order voted to end its official links with the UUP. Trimble faced down Orange Order critics who tried to suspend him for his attendance at a Catholic funeral for a young boy killed by the Real IRA in the Omagh bombing. In a sign of unity, Trimble and President of Ireland Mary McAleese walked into the church together.

In the 2001 general election, the Ulster Unionists lost a number of seats belonging to UUP stalwarts; for example, John Taylor, the former deputy leader of the party, lost his seat of Strangford to Iris Robinson.

The party's misfortunes continued at the 2005 election. The party held six seats at Westminster immediately before the 2005 general election, down from seven after the previous general election following the defection of Jeffrey Donaldson in 2004. The election resulted in the loss of five of their six seats. The only seat won by an Ulster Unionist was North Down, by Sylvia Hermon, who had won the seat in the 2001 general election from Robert McCartney of United Kingdom Unionist Party. David Trimble himself lost his seat in Upper Bann and resigned as party leader soon after. The ensuing leadership election was won by Reg Empey.

Empey leadership
In May 2006 UUP leader Empey attempted to create a new assembly group that would have included Progressive Unionist Party (PUP) leader David Ervine. The PUP is the political wing of the illegal Ulster Volunteer Force (UVF). Many in the UUP, including the last remaining MP, Sylvia Hermon, were opposed to the move. The link was in the form of a new group called the 'Ulster Unionist Party Assembly Group' whose membership was the 24 UUP MLAs and Ervine. Empey justified the link by stating that under the d'Hondt method for allocating ministers in the Assembly, the new group would take a seat in the Executive from Sinn Féin.

Following a request for a ruling from the DUP's Peter Robinson, the Speaker ruled that the UUPAG was not a political party within the meaning of the Political Parties, Elections and Referendums Act 2000.

The party lost 9 seats in the 2007 Northern Ireland Assembly election, retaining 18 MLAs. Empey was the only leader of one of the four main parties not to be re-elected on first preference votes alone in the Assembly elections of March 2007.

In July 2008, the UUP and Conservative Party announced that a joint working group had been established to examine closer ties. On 26 February 2009, the Ulster Unionist Executive and area council of Northern Ireland Conservatives agreed to field joint candidates in future elections to the House of Commons and European Parliament under the name "Ulster Conservatives and Unionists – New Force" (UCUNF). The agreement meant that Ulster Unionist MPs could have sat in a Conservative Government, renewing the relationship that had broken down in 1974 over the Sunningdale Agreement and in 1985 over the Anglo-Irish Agreement. The UUP's sole remaining MP at the time, Sylvia Hermon, opposed the agreement, stating she would not be willing to stand under the UCUNF banner.

In February 2010, Hermon confirmed that she would not be seeking a nomination as a UCUNF candidate for the forthcoming general election. On 25 March 2010, she formally resigned from the party and announced that she would be standing as an independent candidate at the general election. As a result, the UUP were left without representation in the House of Commons for the first time since the party's creation. At the 2010 general election, UCUNF won no seats in Northern Ireland (while Hermon won hers as an independent). The UCUNF label was not used again.

Following the election, Empey resigned as leader. He was replaced by Tom Elliott as party leader in the subsequent leadership election. During the leadership election, it emerged that a quarter of the UUP membership came from Fermanagh and South Tyrone, the constituency of Elliott. The Dublin-based political magazine, the Phoenix, described Elliott as a "blast from the past" and said that his election signified "a significant shift to the right" by the UUP. Shortly after his election, three 2010 general election candidates resigned: Harry Hamilton, Paula Bradshaw and Trevor Ringland. Bradshaw and Hamilton subsequently joined the Alliance Party.

2011–2021

The party lost two seats in the 2011 Assembly elections and won fewer votes than the nationalist Social Democratic and Labour Party (SDLP) (although it won more seats than the SDLP). Two of its candidates, Bill Manwaring and Lesley Macaulay, subsequently joined the Conservative Party. In the 2011 local elections it lost seats to the Alliance Party east of the Bann and was also overtaken by them on Belfast City Council.

Tom Elliott was criticised for comments he made in his victory speech where he described elements of Sinn Féin as "scum". Elliott resigned in March 2012 saying some people had not given him a 'fair opportunity' to develop and progress many party initiatives. Mike Nesbitt was elected leader on 31 March 2012, beating the only other candidate, John McCallister, by 536 votes to 129.

In the 2014 European election Jim Nicholson held his MEP seat, although his percentage of the vote decreased to 13.3% (-3.8%). The party gained 15 seats in the local elections that same day. They polled 16.1% (+0.9%), making it the only party to increase its vote share.

At the 2015 general election, the UUP returned to Westminster, gaining the South Antrim seat from the DUP and Fermanagh & South Tyrone (where they had an electoral pact with the DUP not standing) from Sinn Féin.

In 2016, the UUP and the SDLP decided not to accept the seats on the Northern Ireland Executive to which they would have been entitled and to form an official opposition to the executive. This marked the first time that a devolved government in Northern Ireland did not include the UUP.

In the 2016 European Union referendum the UUP was the only unionist party to support the remain campaign, the UUP Executive passing a motion on 5 March 2016 that the party "believes that on balance Northern Ireland is better remaining in the European Union, with the UK Government pressing for further reform and a return to the founding principle of free trade, not greater political union. The Party respects that individual members may vote for withdrawal."

At the 2017 general election the UUP lost both of its Commons seats, losing South Antrim to the DUP and Fermanagh & South Tyrone to Sinn Féin. The party polled 10.3% (-5.7%) and failed to take any other seats.

In the 2019 local elections the UUP polled 14.1% (-2.0) winning 75 council seats, 13 fewer than in 2014.

They lost their single MEP at the 2019 European Parliament elections following the retirement of Jim Nicholson. Danny Kennedy stood as the UUP candidate polling 9.3% (-4.0%). Steve Aiken succeeded Robin Swann as leader in November 2019.

The party increased its vote share to 11.7% (+1.4%) in the 2019 general election, but failed to re-gain a seat. Their best result was in Fermanagh and South Tyrone, where Tom Elliott lost to Sinn Féin by 57 votes. The UUP currently has no representation in the House of Commons.

Beattie leadership
Steve Aiken resigned on 8 May 2021, and Doug Beattie was elected as leader on 17 May 2021. Beattie, a former soldier, is perceived as a progressive unionist, and it was predicted that, following his election as leader, the party would reclaim some of the centre-ground which they had lost to the Alliance Party.

After Beattie became leader, a number of new members joined the party including former Belfast PUP councillor Julie-Anne Corr-Johnston, Derry and Strabane DUP councillor Ryan McCready, former Independent Irish Senator Ian Marshall, Belfast Alliance Party councillor Carole Howard and Belfast PUP councillor John Kyle
.

In October 2021, Newry and Mourne UUP councillor Harold McKee resigned from the party because of Beattie's promotion of 'liberal values'.

In January 2022 Beattie made what some saw as a misogynistic joke about DAERA minister Edwin Poots and his wife. After this it was found that he had made other controversial jokes on social media, before entering politics, and he made a statement apologizing.

The party nominated 27 candidates across all 18 constituencies for the 2022 Assembly election, an increase of three from the 2017 election. They received 96,390 votes, 11.2% of the total, down 1.7% from the 2017 Assembly election. They had 9 MLAs elected, down 1 from 2017 after Roy Beggs Jr lost his seat in East Antrim to Alliance.

Leaders

Structure

The UUP is organised around the Ulster Unionist Council, which was from 1905 until 2004 the only legal representation of the party. Following the adoption of a new Constitution in 2004, the UUP has been an entity in its own right, however the UUC still exists as the supreme decision-making body of the Party. In autumn 2007 the delegates system was done away with, and today all UUP members are members of the Ulster Unionist Council, with entitlements to vote for the Leader, party officers and on major policy decisions.

Each constituency in Northern Ireland forms the boundary of a UUP constituency association, which is made up of branches formed along local boundaries (usually district electoral areas). There are also four 'representative bodies', the Ulster Women's Unionist Council, the Ulster Young Unionist Council, the Westminster Unionist Association (the party's Great Britain branch) and the Ulster Unionist Councillors Association. Each constituency association and representative body elects a number of delegates to the executive committee, which governs many areas of party administration such as membership and candidate selection.

The UUP maintained a formal connection with the Orange Order from its foundation until 2005, and with the Apprentice Boys of Derry until 1975. While the party was considering structural reforms, including the connection with the Order, it was the Order itself that severed the connection in 2004. The connection with the Apprentice Boys was cut in a 1975 review of the party's structure as they had not taken up their delegates for several years beforehand.

Youth wing
The UUP's youth organisation is the Young Unionists, which was re-constituted by young activists in March 2004 as a rebrand of the Ulster Young Unionist Council. The UYUC was formed in 1946 and disbanded twice, in 1974 and 2004. There is a Young Unionist student association in Queen's University Belfast.

Representatives

Parliament of the United Kingdom
Members of the House of Commons as of December 2019:
The UUP lost its two seats in the 2017 election. South Antrim went to the DUP while Fermanagh and South Tyrone went to Sinn Féin. It failed to regain any seats at the 2019 election.

Members of the House of Lords as of June 2017:
 The Lord Empey
 The Lord Rogan

Northern Ireland Assembly
Members of the Northern Ireland Assembly as elected in May 2022:
 Steve Aiken – South Antrim
 Andy Allen – Belfast East
 Doug Beattie – Upper Bann
 Robbie Butler – Lagan Valley
 Alan Chambers – North Down
 Tom Elliott – Fermanagh and South Tyrone
 Mike Nesbitt – Strangford
 John Stewart – East Antrim
 Robin Swann – North Antrim

Party leadership

Northern Ireland Executive Ministers

Party spokespersons 

The current Party spokespersons include:

Party officers 

The current party officers are:

Electoral performance

Westminster

Stormont

Local government

European Parliament

See also
Ulster Unionist Party politicians
List of Ulster Unionist Party Peers
List of Ulster Unionist Party MPs
Ulster Unionist Chief Whip
Ulster Unionist Party Presidents and General Secretaries

References

Further reading
 John Harbinson, The Ulster Unionist Party, 1882–1973 (Belfast: Blackstaff Press, 1973) 
 Graham Walker, A History of the Ulster Unionist Party: Protest, Pragmatism and Pessimism (Manchester University Press: Manchester Studies in Modern History, 2004)

External links
 

 
Political parties in Northern Ireland
Political parties established in 1905
Political parties in pre-partition Ireland
Conservative Party (UK) breakaway groups
Centre-right parties in the United Kingdom
Alliance of Conservatives and Reformists in Europe member parties
European Conservatives and Reformists member parties
1905 establishments in Ireland